The Kigali Titans are a Rwandan professional basketball team based in Kigali. The team plays in the Rwanda Basketball League (RBL), the highest national level.

History 
The organisation was founded in 2021 by pharmaceutical businessman Eugene Rubonera Junior after the FERWABA announced to create a national second division for men's teams.  Cyril Kalima assumed the function of head coach.

The Titans entered the RBL Division 2 in their debut season, and immediately won the 2021–22 championship that earned the promotion to the top-flight league. The finals of the Division 2 were won 2–0 over Orion BBC. In July 2022, the team signed a $30,000 sponsorship deal with promotion company Afwego Inc. In their second season, the Titans signed international players William Perry, Francis Azolibe  and Álvaro Calvo Masa.

Honours 
Rwanda Basketball League Division 2

 Champions (1): 2021–22

References 

Basketball teams in Rwanda
Basketball teams established in 2021
Sport in Kigali